M. grammica may refer to:

Miaenia grammica, a beetle species
Mordellistena grammica, a beetle species